The Eagle Pass Camino Real Port of Entry (sometimes called (Eagle Pass II) is located at the Camino Real International Bridge. Built in 1999, it is the location where all commercial vehicles entering Eagle Pass are inspected.

References

See also
 Eagle Pass Port of Entry
 List of Mexico–United States border crossings
 List of Canada–United States border crossings

Mexico–United States border crossings
1999 establishments in Texas
Buildings and structures completed in 1999
Buildings and structures in Maverick County, Texas